Knut Mauritz Frostad (born 4 June 1967 in Harstad, Norway) is a Norwegian yachtsman, who has participated in a broad range of world championship level sailing events, including the Volvo Ocean Race and the Olympic Games, the latter in windsurfing. He is currently CEO of Navico, one of the largest manufacturers of marine electronics for the consumer market. Formerly he was the CEO of Volvo Ocean Race.  In total, he has twice participated in the Olympic Games (1988 and 1992) and four times the Volvo Ocean Race; twice as skipper.

In 2004, he won the Scandinavian Nokia Oops Cup and, in 2005, he finished second.

He has a business background in management, director and advisor positions with international companies. He is a recognised motivational speaker as well, and used the race catamaran Academy for company team building and leadership training.

Volvo Ocean Race
His first participation in 1993-94 VOR was in the Swedish Intrum Justitia which finished second.

In the 1997-98 VOR he was skipper and project founder/director at the Norwegian Innovation Kværner and in the 2001-02 VOR in the Norwegian Djuice Dragons.

In the 2005-06 VOR he was watchplan captain on southern ocean legs in the Brazilian Brasil 1.

He was the chief executive for the 2008–09 and the 2011-2012 Volvo Ocean Race, and has returned as the CEO for the 2014-2015 race.

For the 2014-2015 race he has led the transformation of the race from an open class rule to a strict one-design class boat race.

References

External links
 
 
 

1967 births
Living people
People from Harstad
Norwegian male sailors (sport)
Olympic sailors of Norway
Sailors at the 1992 Summer Olympics – Flying Dutchman
Volvo Ocean Race sailors
Sportspeople from Troms og Finnmark